Nematabad may refer to:

Azerbaijan
Nemətabad, Yevlakh Rayon
Aşağı Nemətabad, Agdash Rayon
Yuxarı Nemətabad, Agdash Rayon

Iran
Nematabad, East Azerbaijan
Nematabad, Arsanjan, Fars Province
Nematabad, Jahrom, Fars Province
Nematabad, Kazerun, Fars Province
Nematabad, Marvdasht, Fars Province
Nematabad, Hamadan
Nematabad, Fahraj, Kerman Province
Nematabad, Rafsanjan, Kerman Province
Nematabad, Rigan, Kerman Province
Nematabad, Sirjan, Kerman Province
Nematabad, Kurdistan
Nematabad, Lorestan
Nematabad, Chalus, Mazandaran Province
Nematabad, Nur, Mazandaran Province
Nematabad, Tonekabon, Mazandaran Province